Yellow Fang is a streamliner slingshot dragster.

Designed by Steve Swaja (with some tweaking by owner George Schreiber and his boss, "Big Daddy" Roth) and built by Jim Davis in 1963, the car had a  wheelbase.  The aluminum body, hammered by Tom Hanna for US$5000, had a very pointed nose, canopied cockpit, and V-shaped "claw" tail, and was painted Diamond T yellow with red lettering (hence the name).  The straight front axle had bicycle wheels and wing-like fairings.  The engine, a blown Chrysler hemi (bored  over, for a total displacement of ) prepared by Bill Demerest (but maintained by owner-driver Schreiber), was exposed, as were the wheels.

Early trial passes revealed problems with the cockpit canopy, and when Schreiber took over the driving chores, it was removed. He raced in Australia and the U.S. on an exhibition tour during 1967 and 1968.

The car now resides in the Don Garlits Museum of Drag Racing in Ocala, Florida.

Notes

Sources
 Taylor, Thom.  "Beauty Beyond the Twilight Zone" in Hot Rod, April 2017, pp. 30–43.

1960s cars
Drag racing cars

Rear-wheel-drive vehicles